Love Is You to Me is the third studio album by American Christian singer and songwriter Kim Boyce, released in 1989 on Myrrh Records. Highlights include a duet with the Imperials on the title song, which Boyce co-wrote with member Jimmie Lee Sloas and a cover of Keith Green's "O Lord You're Beautiful". Brian Tankersley, who produced Boyce's first two albums, produced six songs, Rhett Lawrence produced three songs and Christian singer-songwriter Tim Miner produced and co-wrote the track "Tender Heart". The album debuted and peaked at number 13 on the Billboard Top Inspirational Albums chart.

Track listing

Note: The tracks "Dancin' My Heart Away," "Faith" and "Best Friend" were produced by Rhett Lawrence. "Tender Heart" was produced by Tim Miner. All other tracks were produced by Brian Tankersley.

Personnel 
 Kim Boyce – vocals, backing vocals (2, 4-7, 10)
 Brian Tankersley – keyboards (1, 2, 3), synth bass (1, 2), drums (1, 2, 3, 8, 9), backing vocals (1, 8, 9), arrangements (2, 8, 10), percussion (3), bass (8)
 Phil Silas – keyboards (2), synth bass (2), arrangements (2)
 Jimmie Lee Sloas – keyboards (3), arrangements (3)
 Rhett Lawrence – keyboards (4, 5, 7), Fairlight CMI (4, 5, 7), bass (4, 5, 7), drums (4, 5, 7), backing vocals (4), arrangements (4, 5, 7)
 Tim Miner – keyboards (6), backing vocals (6), vocal arrangements (6)
 John Andrew Schreiner – keyboards (8, 9, 10), arrangements (8, 10)
 Michael Hodge – guitars (1-5, 7, 10)
 Tommy Sims – guitars (6), bass (6), backing vocals (6)
 Spencer Campbell – electric bass (1, 2), bass (3)
 Kirk Whalum – saxophone (2, 8, 9)
 David Boruff – saxophone (4)
 Kristina Clark – backing vocals (1, 8)
 Carrie McDowell Hodge – backing vocals (1, 8)
 The Imperials – vocals (3)
 Cindy Cruse – backing vocals (6)
 Don Wallace – backing vocals (6), vocal arrangements (6)
 Bryan Duncan – guest vocals (9)

Production and Technical
 Mark Maxwell – executive producer
 Brian Tankersley – executive producer, recording (1, 2, 3, 8, 9, 10), mixing (1, 2, 3, 8, 9, 10)
 Dan Garcia – recording (4, 5, 7), mixing (4, 5, 7)
 Rhett Lawrence – recording (4, 5, 7)
 David Ebensberger – recording (6)
 Tim Miner – recording (6)
 Win Kutz – mixing (6)
 Ken Allardyce – assistant engineer (1, 2, 3, 5, 9, 10)
 Luis Chi-Sing – assistant engineer (1-4, 7, 9, 10)
 Brian Gardner – mastering at Bernie Grundman Mastering (Hollywood, California)
 Joan Tankersley – art direction 
 Janice Watson – design 
 Laurie Fink – cover coordinator 
 Bonnie Lewis – photography

Charts

Radio singles

References

1989 albums
Kim Boyce albums
Myrrh Records albums
Word Records albums